The 1970 FIFA World Cup qualification UEFA Group 4 was a UEFA qualifying group for the 1970 FIFA World Cup. The group comprised Northern Ireland, Soviet Union and Turkey.

Standings

Matches

External links 
Group 4 Detailed Results at RSSSF

4
1968–69 in Northern Ireland association football
1969–70 in Northern Ireland association football
1968 in Soviet football
1969 in Soviet football
1968–69 in Turkish football
1969–70 in Turkish football